Datuk Seri Ab Rauf bin Yusoh  (born 20 September 1961) is a Malaysian politician who has currently served as Senior Member of the Malacca State Executive Council (EXCO) in the Barisan Nasional (BN) state administration under Chief Minister Sulaiman Md Ali since November 2021 and Member of the Malacca State Legislative Assembly (MLA) for Tanjung Bidara since November 2021. He served as Speaker of the Malacca State Legislative Assembly from May 2020 to October 2021. He is a member of the United Malays National Organisation (UMNO), a component party of the ruling Barisan Nasional (BN) coalition. He is State Chairman of Malacca UMNO and BN.

Election results

Honours
 :
 Commander of the Order of Meritorious Service (PJN) – Datuk (2010)
 :
 Companion Class I of the Exalted Order of Malacca (DMSM) – Datuk (2002)
 Knight Commander of the Exalted Order of Malacca (DCSM) – Datuk Wira (2014)
 Grand Commander of the Exalted Order of Malacca (DGSM) – Datuk Seri (2017)
 :
 Grand Knight of the Order of Sultan Ahmad Shah of Pahang (SSAP) – Dato’ Sri (2015)

Contributions 
On his time in the office as the Exco, Datuk Seri Ab Rauf bin Yusoh has worked closely with the state's governmental bodies as such Unit Perancangan Ekonomi Negeri (UPEN) Melaka, Malaysia Investment and Development Authority (MIDA), Perbadanan Kemajuan Negeri Melaka (PKNM) together with other private companies and corporations from both local and international. This has helped the state to secure various development projects and direct investments.

Some of the notable projects proposed  as per SME Malaysia and the official Facebook postings of the Governmental Bodies was the Light Transit Railway System (LRT)  that uses Magnetic Levitation (MagLev) Technology to be constructed throughout the state connecting all the districts in Melaka.

References

1961 births
Living people
People from Malacca
United Malays National Organisation politicians
Members of the Malacca State Legislative Assembly
Malacca state executive councillors
Speakers of the Malacca State Legislative Assembly
Commanders of the Order of Meritorious Service